Tithy Rani Sarkar (born 12 August 1990) is a Bangladeshi former cricketer who played as a right-arm off break bowler. She appeared in one One Day International and two Twenty20 Internationals for Bangladesh in 2012. She played domestic cricket for Dhaka Division, Rangpur Division and Chittagong Division.

Early life and background
Sarkar was born on 12 August 1990 in Bangladesh.

Career

ODI career
Sarkar made her ODI debut against Ireland on 21 August 2012.

T20I career
Sarkar made her T20I debut against India on 11 September 2012.

Asian games
Sarkar was a member of the team that won a silver medal in cricket against the China national women's cricket team at the 2010 Asian Games in Guangzhou, China.

References

External links
 
 

1990 births
Living people
Bangladeshi women cricketers
Bangladesh women One Day International cricketers
Bangladesh women Twenty20 International cricketers
Bangladeshi Hindus
Dhaka Division women cricketers
Rangpur Division women cricketers
Chittagong Division women cricketers
Cricketers at the 2010 Asian Games
Asian Games medalists in cricket
Asian Games silver medalists for Bangladesh
Medalists at the 2010 Asian Games